The Z117/118 Beijing-Jilin Through Train is Chinese railway running between the capital Beijing to Jilin City express passenger trains by the Shenyang Railway Bureau, Jilin passenger segment responsible for passenger transport task, JIlin originating on the Beijing train. 25T Type Passenger trains running along the Jingha Railway and Changtu Railway across Jilin, Liaoning, Hebei, Tianjin, Beijing and other provinces and cities, the entire 1131 km. Beijing railway station to Jilin railway station running 14 hours and 9 minutes, use trips for Z117; Jilin railway station to Beijing railway station to run 12 hours and 17 minutes, use trips for Z118.

Carriages

Locomotives

Timetable

See also 
D73/74 Beijing-Jilin Through Train
G383/384 Beijing-Jilin Through Train

References 

Passenger rail transport in China
Rail transport in Beijing
Rail transport in Jilin